Brennberg is a municipality in the district of Regensburg in Bavaria in Germany.

People 
 Hermann Höcherl (1912-1989), politician (CSU)

References 

Regensburg (district)